Micronia notabilis is a species of moth of subfamily Microniinae of family Uraniidae that is found in Papua New Guinea. The species was first described by Arnold Pagenstecher in 1900.

References 

Moths of Papua New Guinea
Uraniidae
Moths described in 1900